Second Hand Husband is a 2015 Indian romantic comedy film produced by GB Entertainment and directed by Smeep Kang and starring Gippy Grewal, Tina Ahuja, and Dharmendra. The film marks the Bollywood film debut of Govinda’s daughter, Tina Ahuja, and Punjabi singer and actor Gippy Grewal. The film released on 3 July 2015.

Plot
Rajbir (Gippy Grewal) and Gurpreet (Tina Ahuja) are in love and want to marry each other. The only thing stopping them is the alimony that Rajbir has to pay every month to his ex-wife, Neha (Geeta Basra). Gurpreet, being a lawyer, is aware that the alimony needs to be paid only until Neha remarries. Thus, begins the two lover's journey to find a suitable groom for Rajbir's ex-wife. Their comic journey goes through various twists and turns and finally culminates at a point where Rajbir's boss, Ajit Singh (Dharmendra), gets into trouble with his wife because of his flirtatious ways.

Cast
 Gippy Grewal as Rajbir Singh Grewal aka Rajbir
 Tina Ahuja as Gurpreet Kaur
 Dharmendra as Ajit Singh
 Rati Agnihotri as Beant Kaur (Ajit's wife)
 Geeta Basra as Neha Kaur Grewal
 Ravi Kishan as Gurpreet's brother
 Gurpreet Ghuggi as Bhagwan Chai Wala
 Alok Nath as Gurpreet's father
 Sanjay Mishra as Ajit's wife's lawyer
 Vijay Raaz as Inspector Rakesh
 Rubina as Vijay Raaz's love interest
 Karamjit Anmol as constable
 Deepshikha Nagpal as Kajal
 Supriya Karnik as Pammi
 Mukesh Tiwari as Baldev, Pammi's husband
 Harbhajan Singh as a police officer (special appearance)

Production
Geeta Basra joined the cast in December 2014. Govinda's daughter Tina Ahuja is being launched in the film as Narmmadaa.

Soundtrack

References

External links
 

2015 films
2010s Hindi-language films
Films scored by Dr Zeus
Films scored by Badshah
Films scored by Jatinder Shah
2015 romantic comedy films
Indian romantic comedy films